Events in the year 1727 in Norway.

Incumbents
Monarch: Frederick IV

Events

Arts and literature

Births
22 February – Christen Schmidt, bishop (died 1804).
19 July – Ditlevine Feddersen, culture personality  (died 1803).
Eistein Kjørn, woodcarver (born 1805).

Deaths

9 April – Thomas von Westen, priest and missionary (born 1682).
29 May – James Collett, timber trader (born 1655).

See also

References